Amelie Hunter (born 23 February 1980) is a former Australian cricketer. A wicket-keeper and right-handed lower order batter, she played 30 List A matches for Victoria in the Women's National Cricket League (WNCL) between 2002–03 and 2005–06. As Victoria's wicket-keeper, she took 17 catches and 12 stumpings during her time in the WNCL.

References

External links
 
 

1980 births
Living people
Australian cricketers
Australian women cricketers
Victoria women cricketers
Place of birth missing (living people)
Wicket-keepers